The men's 110 metres hurdles event at the 1990 Commonwealth Games was held on 27 and 28 January at the Mount Smart Stadium in Auckland.

Medalists

Results

Heats
Qualification: First 4 of each heat (Q) and the next 1 fastest (q) qualified for the final.

Wind:Heat 1: +1.0 m/s, Heat 2: +3.0 m/s

Final
Wind: +0.5 m/s

References

110
1990